Events in the year 1835 in Norway.

Incumbents
Monarch: Charles III John

Events

 5 November - Christiania Offentlige Theater burns down. 
 29 November – Population Census: Norway had 1,194,827 inhabitants.

Arts and literature

Births
15 May – Henrik Mohn, meteorologist (d.1916)

Full date unknown
Baard Madsen Haugland, politician (d.1896)
Olaf Isaachsen, painter (d.1893)
Nils Trondsen Thune, politician
August Weenaas, Lutheran minister, founding President of Augsburg University in the USA (d.1924)

Deaths
24 March – Ole Olsen Amundrød, farmer, schoolteacher and politician (b. 1771)
8 August – Jørgen Mandix, judge (b. 1759).
15 September – Henrik Carstensen, businessman, timber merchant and shipowner (b. 1753)
26 September – Nils Astrup, politician (b.1778)

Full date unknown
Diderik Hegermann, politician and Minister (b.1763)

See also

References